WCBY (1240 AM and W264CF 100.7 FM) is a radio station in Cheboygan, Michigan, broadcasting a classic country format delivered by Westwood One  "Big Country Gold" is the slogan, which plays off sister country FM WMKC 102.9 known as "Big Country - 102-9". WCBY is owned by Black Diamond Broadcast Holdings, LLC.

The station began broadcasting in 1954 as a 250-watt station under the ownership of Straits Broadcasting.  For over a quarter-century the station featured a full-service format featuring popular music which was chiefly MOR in nature but included some Top 40 fare to appeal to younger listeners after school hours.  An FM sister, 25,000-watt WCBY-FM at 105.1, was added in 1968 and aired a beautiful music format.

WCBY-AM/FM were sold in 1981 to Fabiano-Strickler Communications, which implemented format changes at both AM and FM, changing the AM to country music and the FM to Top 40, eventually changing the FM's call letters to WQLZ and boosting its power to 100,000 watts.  In 1989, WGFM and WQLZ came under the ownership of Del Reynolds, who had begun his broadcasting career at WCBY in the 1960s, and his wife Mary.  WCBY-AM adopted an MOR/adult standards format which continued for over two decades, and WQLZ became WGFM with a classic rock format as "W-Gold FM", later changing to "The Bear" and most recently to "Real Rock 105 & 95-5" (simulcast with WJZJ-FM Traverse City).  At various times WCBY featured programming from the Music of Your Life network and from Waitt Radio Networks' "The Lounge" format.

In April 2010, WCBY dropped standards in favor of the classic country format formerly heard on FM sister station  94.5 FM.

In October 2012, WCBY added a presence on the FM dial with translator 100.7 W264CF Saint Ignace.  In the early days of WCBY, the station had a studio in St. Ignace but closed that studio when Mighty-Mac Broadcasting Company's WIDG signed on the air.

In February 2015, WCBY became an affiliate of CBS Radio airing hourly national news, complemented by local news, sports, and community information.

WCBY airs Cheboygan Chief basketball and football games as well as Detroit Tigers Baseball and Detroit Red Wings Hockey games.

WCBY streams on line at www.bigcountrygold.com

References
Michiguide.com - WCBY History

External links

CBY
Classic country radio stations in the United States
Radio stations established in 1954